Gonoshikha is a rural locality (a selo) and the administrative center of Gonoshikhinsky Selsoviet, Zarinsky District, Altai Krai, Russia. The population was 593 as of 2013. There are 9 streets.

Geography 
Gonoshikha is located 15 km southeast of Zarinsk (the district's administrative centre) by road. Novokrasilovo and Starokopylovo are the nearest rural localities.

References 

Rural localities in Zarinsky District